Player's Paradise is the second album by rapper and producer, Nitty. The album peaked at #30 on the Billboard Top Heatseekers chart.  The song "Hey Bitty" appears on NBA Street Vol. 3.

Track listing
"ABC"
"Hey Bitty"
"Nasty Girl"
"Like That"
"Sorry"
"Hey Girl"
"Wind It Up"
"Move Your Body"
"Player at Work (Interlude)"
"Unh!
"Fly"
"It's Official"

Samples
 "ABC" contains a sample of Grace Jones' "My Jamaican Guy".
 "Nasty Girl" contains a sample of The Archies' "Sugar Sugar".
 "Hey Bitty" contains a sample of Toni Basil's "Mickey".
 "Sorry" contains a sample of Michael Jackson's "I Wanna Be Where You Are".
 "Like That" contains a sample of Culture Club's "Do You Really Want to Hurt Me".

References

2005 albums
Nitty (musician) albums
Universal Records albums